My Master may refer to:
 My Master (book), a book written by Swami Vivekananda and published in 1901
 Rabbi, a teacher of Torah
 Sidi, a masculine title of respect in Western Arabic language and Egyptian Arabic
 My Master App, an application software iOS development